Aleksander Sopliński (25 March 1942 – 20 April 2021) was a Polish politician. He was elected to the Sejm on 25 September 2005, getting 2,589 votes in 16 Płock district as a candidate from the Polish People's Party list.

See also
Members of Polish Sejm 2005–2007

References

External links
Aleksander Sopliński - parliamentary page – includes declarations of interest, voting record, and transcripts of speeches.

1942 births
2021 deaths
Members of the Polish Sejm 2005–2007
Members of the Polish Sejm 2007–2011
Polish People's Party politicians
People from Ciechanów